The Cocos (Keeling) Islands, officially the Territory of Cocos (Keeling) Islands, are an Australian external territory in the Indian Ocean, comprising a small archipelago approximately midway between Australia and Sri Lanka and relatively close to the Indonesian island of Sumatra. The territory's dual name (official since the islands' incorporation into Australia in 1955) reflects that the islands have historically been known as either the Cocos Islands or the Keeling Islands.

The territory consists of two atolls made up of 27 coral islands, of which only two – West Island and Home Island – are inhabited. The population of around 600 people consists mainly of Cocos Malays, who mostly practice Sunni Islam and speak a dialect of Malay as their first language. However, the islanders do have a degree of self-government through the local shire council. Many public services – including health, education, and policing – are provided by the state of Western Australia, and Western Australian law applies except where the federal government has determined otherwise. The territory also uses Western Australian postcodes.

The islands were discovered in 1609 by the British sea captain William Keeling, but no settlement occurred until the early 19th century. One of the first settlers was John Clunies-Ross, a Scottish merchant; much of the island's current population is descended from the Malay workers he brought in to work his copra plantation. The Clunies-Ross family ruled the islands as a private fiefdom for almost 150 years, with the head of the family usually recognised as resident magistrate. The British annexed the islands in 1857, and for the next century they were administered from either Ceylon or Singapore. The territory was transferred to Australia in 1955, although until 1979 virtually all of the territory's real estate still belonged to the Clunies-Ross family.

Name 

The islands have been called the Cocos Islands (from 1622), the Keeling Islands (from 1703), the Cocos–Keeling Islands (since James Horsburgh in 1805) and the Keeling–Cocos Islands (19th century). Cocos refers to the abundant coconut trees, while Keeling refers to William Keeling, who discovered the islands in 1609.

John Clunies-Ross, who sailed there in the Borneo in 1825, called the group the Borneo Coral Isles, restricting Keeling to North Keeling, and calling South Keeling "the Cocos properly so called". The form Cocos (Keeling) Islands, attested from 1916, was made official by the Cocos (Keeling) Islands Act 1955.

The territory's Malay name is Pulu Kokos (Keeling). Sign boards on the island also feature Malay translations.

Geography 
The climate is pleasant, moderated by the southeast trade winds for about nine months of the year and with moderate rainfall. Tropical cyclones may occur in the early months of the year.

The island measures  in land area and is uninhabited. It is home to the only surviving population of the endemic, and endangered, Cocos Buff-banded Rail.

Only Home Island and West Island are populated. The Cocos Malays maintain weekend shacks, referred to as pondoks, on most of the larger islands.

There are no rivers or lakes on either atoll. Fresh water resources are limited to water lenses on the larger islands, underground accumulations of rainwater lying above the seawater. These lenses are accessed through shallow bores or wells.

Flora and fauna

Climate
Cocos (Keeling) Islands experience a tropical rainforest climate (Af) according to the Köppen climate classification; the archipelago lies approximately midway between the equator and the Tropic of Capricorn. The archipelago has two distinct seasons, the wet season and the dry season. The wettest month is April with precipitation totaling , and the driest month is October with precipitation totaling . Due to the strong maritime control, temperatures vary little although its location is some distance from the Equator.

Demographics
According to the 2021 Australian Census, the current population of the Cocos Islands is 593 people. The median age of the population is 40 years, slightly older than the median Australian population age of 38 years. As of 2021, there are no people living on the Cocos Islands who identify as Indigenous Australians (Aboriginal or Torres Strait Islander).

The majority religion of the Cocos Islands is Islam, with 65.6% of the total population identifying as Muslim, followed by Unspecified (15.3%), Non-religious(14.0%), Catholic (2.0%), Anglican (1.5%). The remaining 1.6% of Cocos Islanders identify as secular or hold various other beliefs (including atheism, agnosticism and unspecified spiritual beliefs).

73.5% of the population were born in Australia - either on the mainland, on the Cocos Islands, or in another Australian territory. The remaining 26.5% born outside of Australia come from various countries, including Malaysia (4.0%), England (1.3%), New Zealand (1.2%), Singapore (0.5%) and Argentina (0.5%), among others. 61.2% of the population speak Malay rather than English at home, while 19.1% use English as their primary language and 3.5% speak another language (including Spanish and various Austronesian and African languages). 

Kaum Ibu (Women's Group) is a women's rights organisation that represents the view of women at a local and national level.

History

Discovery and early history

The archipelago was discovered in 1609 by Captain William Keeling of the East India Company, on a return voyage from the East Indies. North Keeling was sketched by Ekeberg, a Swedish captain, in 1749, showing the presence of coconut palms. It also appears on a 1789 chart produced by British hydrographer Alexander Dalrymple.

In 1825, Scottish merchant seaman Captain John Clunies-Ross stopped briefly at the islands on a trip to India, nailing up a Union Jack and planning to return and settle on the islands with his family in the future. Wealthy Englishman Alexander Hare had similar plans, and hired a captain coincidentally, Clunies-Ross's brotherto bring him and a volunteer harem of 40 Malay women to the islands, where he hoped to establish his private residence. Hare had previously served as resident of Banjarmasin, a town in Borneo, and found that "he could not confine himself to the tame life that civilisation affords".

Clunies-Ross returned two years later with his wife, children and mother-in-law, and found Hare already established on the island and living with the private harem. A feud grew between the two. Clunies-Ross's eight sailors "began at once the invasion of the new kingdom to take possession of it, women and all".

After some time, Hare's women began deserting him, and instead finding themselves partners amongst Clunies-Ross's sailors. Disheartened, Hare left the island. He died in Bencoolen in 1834. Encouraged by members of the former harem, Clunies-Ross then recruited Malays to come to the island for work and wives.

Clunies-Ross's workers were paid in a currency called the Cocos rupee, a currency John Clunies-Ross minted himself that could only be redeemed at the company store.

On 1 April 1836,  under Captain Robert FitzRoy arrived to take soundings to establish the profile of the atoll as part of the survey expedition of the Beagle. To the naturalist Charles Darwin, aboard the ship, the results supported a theory he had developed of how atolls formed, which he later published as The Structure and Distribution of Coral Reefs. He studied the natural history of the islands and collected specimens. Darwin's assistant Syms Covington noted that "an Englishman [he was in fact Scottish] and HIS family, with about sixty or seventy mulattos from the Cape of Good Hope, live on one of the islands. Captain Ross, the governor, is now absent at the Cape."

Annexation by the British Empire
The islands were annexed by the British Empire in 1857. Fremantle claimed the islands for the British Empire and appointed Ross II as Superintendent. In 1878, by Letters Patent, the Governor of Ceylon was made Governor of the islands, and, by further Letters Patent in 1886, responsibility for the islands was transferred to the Governor of the Straits Settlement to exercise his functions as "Governor of Cocos Islands".

The islands were made part of the Straits Settlement under an Order in Council of 20 May 1903. Meanwhile, in 1886 Queen Victoria had, by indenture, granted the islands in perpetuity to John Clunies-Ross. The head of the family enjoyed semi-official status as Resident Magistrate and Government representative.

In 1901 a telegraph cable station was established on Direction Island. Undersea cables went to Rodrigues, Mauritius, Batavia, Java and Fremantle, Western Australia. In 1910 a wireless station was established to communicate with passing ships. The cable station ceased operation in 1966.

World War I

On the morning of 9 November 1914, the islands became the site of the Battle of Cocos, one of the first naval battles of World War I. A landing party from the German cruiser  captured and disabled the wireless and cable communications station on Direction Island, but not before the station was able to transmit a distress call. An Allied troop convoy was passing nearby, and the Australian cruiser  was detached from the convoy escort to investigate.

Sydney spotted the island and Emden at 09:15, with both ships preparing for combat. At 11:20, the heavily damaged Emden beached herself on North Keeling Island. The Australian warship broke to pursue Emdens supporting collier, which scuttled herself, then returned to North Keeling Island at 16:00. At this point, Emdens battle ensign was still flying: usually a sign that a ship intends to continue fighting. After no response to instructions to lower the ensign, two salvoes were shot into the beached cruiser, after which the Germans lowered the flag and raised a white sheet. Sydney had orders to ascertain the status of the transmission station, but returned the next day to provide medical assistance to the Germans.

Casualties totaled 134 personnel aboard Emden killed, and 69 wounded, compared to four killed and 16 wounded aboard Sydney. The German survivors were taken aboard the Australian cruiser, which caught up to the troop convoy in Colombo on 15 November, then transported to Malta and handed over the prisoners to the British Army. An additional 50 German personnel from the shore party, unable to be recovered before Sydney arrived, commandeered a schooner and escaped from Direction Island, eventually arriving in Constantinople. Emden was the last active Central Powers warship in the Indian or Pacific Ocean, which meant troopships from Australia and New Zealand could sail without naval escort, and Allied ships could be deployed elsewhere.

World War II
During World War II, the cable station was once again a vital link. The Cocos were valuable for direction finding by the Y service, the worldwide intelligence system used during the war.

Allied planners noted that the islands might be seized as an airfield for German planes and as a base for commerce raiders operating in the Indian Ocean. Following Japan's entry into the war, Japanese forces occupied neighbouring islands. To avoid drawing their attention to the Cocos cable station and its islands' garrison, the seaplane anchorage between Direction and Horsburgh islands was not used. Radio transmitters were also kept silent, except in emergencies.

After the Fall of Singapore in 1942, the islands were administered from Ceylon (Sri Lanka), and West and Direction Islands were placed under Allied military administration. The islands' garrison initially consisted of a platoon from the British Army's King's African Rifles, located on Horsburgh Island, with two  guns to cover the anchorage. The local inhabitants all lived on Home Island. Despite the importance of the islands as a communication centre, the Japanese made no attempt either to raid or to occupy them and contented themselves with sending over a reconnaissance aircraft about once a month.

On the night of 8–9 May 1942, 15 members of the garrison, from the Ceylon Defence Force, mutinied under the leadership of Gratien Fernando. The mutineers were said to have been provoked by the attitude of their British officers and were also supposedly inspired by Japanese anti-British propaganda. They attempted to take control of the gun battery on the islands. The Cocos Islands Mutiny was crushed, but the mutineers murdered one non-mutinous soldier and wounded one officer. Seven of the mutineers were sentenced to death at a trial that was later alleged to have been improperly conducted, though the guilt of the accused was admitted. Four of the sentences were commuted, but three men were executed, including Fernando. These were to be the only British Commonwealth soldiers executed for mutiny during the Second World War.

On 25 December 1942, the Japanese submarine I-166 bombarded the islands but caused no damage.

Later in the war, two airstrips were built, and three bomber squadrons were moved to the islands to conduct raids against Japanese targets in South East Asia and to provide support during the planned reinvasion of Malaya and reconquest of Singapore. The first aircraft to arrive were Supermarine Spitfire Mk VIIIs of No. 136 Squadron RAF. They included some Liberator bombers from No. 321 (Netherlands) Squadron RAF (members of exiled Dutch forces serving with the Royal Air Force), which were also stationed on the islands. When in July 1945 No. 99 and No. 356 RAF squadrons arrived on West Island, they brought with them a daily newspaper called Atoll which contained news of what was happening in the outside world. Run by airmen in their off-duty hours, it achieved fame when dropped by Liberator bombers on POW camps over the heads of the Japanese guards.

In 1946, the administration of the islands reverted to Singapore and it became part of the Colony of Singapore.

Transfer to Australia
On 23 November 1955, the islands were transferred from the United Kingdom to the Commonwealth of Australia. Immediately before the transfer the islands were part of the United Kingdom's Colony of Singapore, in accordance with the Straits Settlements (Repeal) Act, 1946 of the United Kingdom and the British Settlements Acts, 1887 and 1945, as applied by the Act of 1946. The legal steps for effecting the transfer were as follows:
The Commonwealth Parliament and the Government requested and consented to the enactment of a United Kingdom Act for the purpose.
The Cocos Islands Act, 1955, authorized Her Majesty, by Order in Council, to direct that the islands should cease to form part of the Colony of Singapore and be placed under the authority of the Commonwealth.
By the Cocos (Keeling) Islands Act, 1955, the Parliament of the Commonwealth provided for the acceptance of the islands as a territory under the authority of the Commonwealth and for its government. 
The Cocos Islands Order in Council, 1955, made under the United Kingdom Act of 1955, provided that upon the appointed day (23 November 1955) the islands should cease to form part of the Colony of Singapore and be placed under the authority of the Commonwealth of Australia.
The reason for this comparatively complex machinery was due to the terms of the Straits Settlement (Repeal) Act, 1946. According to Sir Kenneth Roberts-Wray "any other procedure would have been of doubtful validity". The separation involved three steps: separation from the Colony of Singapore; transfer by United Kingdom and acceptance by Australia.

H. J. Hull was appointed the first official representative (now administrator) of the new territory. He had been a lieutenant-commander in the Royal Australian Navy and was released for the purpose. Under Commonwealth Cabinet Decision 1573 of 9 September 1958, Hull's appointment was terminated and John William Stokes was appointed on secondment from the Northern Territory police. A media release at the end of October 1958 by the Minister for Territories, Hasluck, commended Hull's three years of service on Cocos.

Stokes served in the position from 31 October 1958 to 30 September 1960. His son's boyhood memories and photos of the Islands have been published. C. I. Buffett MBE from Norfolk Island succeeded him and served from 28 July 1960 to 30 June 1966, and later acted as Administrator back on Cocos and on Norfolk Island. In 1974, Ken Mullen wrote a small book about his time with wife and son from 1964 to 1966 working at the Cable Station on Direction Island.

In the 1970s, the Australian government's dissatisfaction with the Clunies-Ross feudal style of rule of the island increased. By agreement, the family retained ownership of Oceania House, their home on the island. In 1983, the Australian government reneged on this agreement and told John Clunies-Ross that he should leave the Cocos. The following year the High Court of Australia ruled that resumption of Oceania House was unlawful, but the Australian government ordered that no government business was to be granted to Clunies-Ross's shipping company, an action that contributed to his bankruptcy. John Clunies-Ross later moved to Perth, Western Australia. However, some members of the Clunies-Ross family still live on the Cocos.

Extensive preparations were undertaken by the government of Australia to prepare the Cocos Malays to vote in their referendum of self-determination. Discussions began in 1982, with an aim of holding the referendum, under United Nations supervision, in mid-1983. Under guidelines developed by the UN Decolonization Committee, residents were to be offered three choices: full independence, free association, or integration with Australia. The last option was preferred by both the islanders and the Australian government. A change in government in Canberra following the March 1983 Australian elections delayed the vote by one year. While the Home Island Council stated a preference for a traditional communal consensus "vote", the UN insisted on a secret ballot. The referendum was held on 6 April 1984, with all 261 eligible islanders participating, including the Clunies-Ross family: 229 voted for integration, 21 for Free Association, nine for independence, and two failed to indicate a preference. In recent years a series of disputes have occurred between the Muslim and the non-Muslim population of the islands.

Indigenous status
Descendants of the Cocos Malays brought to the islands from the Malay Peninsula, the Indonesian archipelago, Southern Africa and New Guinea by Hare and by Clunies-Ross as indentured workers, slaves or convicts are  seeking recognition from the Australian government to be acknowledged as Indigenous Australians.

Government 

The capital of the Territory of Cocos (Keeling) Islands is West Island while the largest settlement is the village of Bantam, on Home Island.

Governance of the islands is based on the Cocos (Keeling) Islands Act 1955 and depends heavily on the laws of Australia. The islands are administered from Canberra by the Department of Infrastructure, Transport, Regional Development and Communications through a non-resident Administrator appointed by the Governor-General. They were previously the responsibility of the Department of Transport and Regional Services (before 2007), the Attorney-General's Department (2007–2013), Department of Infrastructure and Regional Development (2013–2017) and Department of Infrastructure, Regional Development and Cities (2017-2020).

The current Administrator is Natasha Griggs, who was appointed on 5 October 2017 and is also the Administrator of Christmas Island. These two territories comprise the Australian Indian Ocean Territories. The Australian Government provides Commonwealth-level government services through the Christmas Island Administration and the Department of Infrastructure and Regional Development. As per the Federal Government's Territories Law Reform Act 1992, which came into force on 1 July 1992, Western Australian laws are applied to the Cocos Islands, "so far as they are capable of applying in the Territory"; non-application or partial application of such laws is at the discretion of the federal government. The Act also gives Western Australian courts judicial power over the islands. The Cocos Islands remain constitutionally distinct from Western Australia, however; the power of the state to legislate for the territory is power-delegated by the federal government. The kind of services typically provided by a state government elsewhere in Australia are provided by departments of the Western Australian Government, and by contractors, with the costs met by the federal government.

There also exists a unicameral Cocos (Keeling) Islands Shire Council with seven seats. A full term lasts four years, though elections are held every two years; approximately half the members retire each two years.  the president of the shire is Aindil Minkom.

Federal politics

Cocos (Keeling) Islands residents who are Australian citizens also vote in federal elections. Cocos (Keeling) Islanders are represented in the House of Representatives by the member for the Division of Lingiari (in the Northern Territory) and in the Senate by Northern Territory senators. At the 2016 federal election, the Labor Party received absolute majorities from Cocos electors in both the House of Representatives and the Senate.

Defence and law enforcement

Defence is the responsibility of the Australian Defence Force. There are no active military installations or defence personnel on the islands. The Administrator may request the assistance of the Australian Defence Force if required. The 2016 Australian Defence White Paper stated that the airfield in the island would be upgraded to support the RAAF's P-8 Poseidon maritime patrol aircraft.

Civilian law enforcement and community policing is provided by the Australian Federal Police. The normal deployment to the island is one sergeant and one constable. These are augmented by two locally engaged Special Members who have police powers.

Courts

Since 1992, court services have been provided by the Western Australian Department of the Attorney-General under a service delivery arrangement with the Australian Government. Western Australian Court Services provide Magistrates Court, District Court, Supreme Court, Family Court, Children's Court, Coroner's Court and Registry for births, deaths and marriages and change of name services. Magistrates and judges from Western Australia convene a circuit court as required.

Health care

Economy 

The population of the islands is approximately 600. There is a small and growing tourist industry focused on water-based or nature activities. In 2016, a beach on Direction Island was named the best beach in Australia by Brad Farmer, an Aquatic and Coastal Ambassador for Tourism Australia and co-author of 101 Best Beaches 2017.

Small local gardens and fishing contribute to the food supply, but most food and most other necessities must be imported from Australia or elsewhere.

The Cocos Islands Cooperative Society Ltd. employs construction workers, stevedores, and lighterage worker operations. Tourism employs others. The unemployment rate was 6.7% in 2011.

Plastic pollution
A 2019 study led by Jennifer Lavers from the University of Tasmania's Institute of Marine and Antarctic Studies published in the journal Scientific Reports estimated the volume of plastic rubbish on the Islands as around 414 million pieces, weighing 238 tonnes, 93% of which lies buried under the sand. It said that previous surveys which only assessed surface garbage probably "drastically underestimated the scale of debris accumulation". The plastic waste found in the study consisted mostly of single-use items such as bottles, plastic cutlery, bags and drinking straws.

Strategic importance 

The Cocos Islands are strategically important because of their proximity to shipping lanes in the Indian and Pacific oceans. The United States and Australia have expressed interest in stationing surveillance drones on the Cocos Islands. Euronews described the plan as Australian support for an increased American presence in Southeast Asia, but expressed concern that it was likely to upset Chinese officials.

James Cogan has written for the World Socialist Web Site that the plan to station surveillance drones at Cocos is one component of former US President Barack Obama's "pivot" towards Asia, facilitating control of the sea lanes and potentially allowing US forces to enforce a blockade against China. After plans to construct airbases were reported on by The Washington Post, Australian defence minister Stephen Smith stated that the Australian government views the "Cocos as being potentially a long-term strategic location, but that is down the track."

Communications and transport

Transport
The Cocos (Keeling) Islands have  of highway.

There is one paved airport on the West Island. A tourist bus operates on Home Island.

The only airport is Cocos (Keeling) Islands Airport with a single  paved runway. Virgin Australia operates scheduled jet services from Perth Airport via Christmas Island. After 1952, the airport at Cocos Islands was a stop for airline flights between Australia and South Africa, and Qantas and South African Airways stopped there to refuel. The arrival of long-range jet aircraft ended this need in 1967.

The Cocos Islands Cooperative Society operates an interisland ferry, the Cahaya Baru, connecting West, Home and Direction Islands, as well as a bus service on West Island.

There is a lagoon anchorage between Horsburgh and Direction islands for larger vessels, while yachts have a dedicated anchorage area in the southern lee of Direction Island. There are no major seaports on the islands.

Communications
The islands are connected within Australia's telecommunication system (with number range +61 8 9162 xxxx). Public phones are located on both West Island and Home Island. A reasonably reliable GSM mobile phone network (number range +61 406 xxx), run by CiiA (Christmas Island Internet Association), operates on Cocos (Keeling) Islands. SIM cards (full size) and recharge cards can be purchased from the Telecentre on West Island to access this service.

Australia Post provides mail services with the postcode 6799. There are post offices on West Island and Home Island. Standard letters and express post items are sent by air twice weekly, but all other mail is sent by sea and can take up to two months for delivery.

Internet
.cc is the Internet country code top-level domain (ccTLD) for Cocos (Keeling) Islands. It is administered by VeriSign through a subsidiary company eNIC, which promotes it for international registration as "the next .com"; .cc was originally assigned in October 1997 to eNIC Corporation of Seattle WA by the IANA. The Turkish Republic of Northern Cyprus also uses the .cc domain, along with .nc.tr.

Internet access on Cocos is provided by CiiA (Christmas Island Internet Association), and is supplied via satellite ground station on West Island, and distributed via a wireless PPPoE-based WAN on both inhabited islands. Casual internet access is available at the Telecentre on West Island and the Indian Ocean Group Training office on Home Island.

The National Broadband Network announced in early 2012 that it would extend service to Cocos in 2015 via high-speed satellite link.

The Oman Australia Cable, scheduled for 2021, will feature a branch to the Cocos Islands.

Media 

The Cocos (Keeling) Islands have access to a range of modern communication services. Digital television stations are broadcast from Western Australia via satellite. A local radio station, 6CKI – Voice of the Cocos (Keeling) Islands, is staffed by community volunteers and provides some local content.

Newspapers
The Cocos Islands Community Resource Centre publishes a fortnightly newsletter called The Atoll. It is available in paper and electronic formats.

Television
 Australian
The Cocos (Keeling) Islands receives a range of digital channels from Western Australia via satellite and is broadcast from the Airport Building on the West Island on the following VHF frequencies: ABC6, SBS7, WAW8, WOW10 and WDW11

 Malaysian
From 2013 onwards, Cocos Island received four Malaysian channels via satellite: TV3, ntv7, 8TV and TV9.

Education 
There is a school in the archipelago, Cocos Islands District High School, with campuses located on West Island (Kindergarten to Year 10), and the other on Home Island (Kindergarten to Year 6). CIDHS is part of the Western Australia Department of Education. School instruction is in English on both campuses, with Cocos Malay teacher aides assisting the younger children in Kindergarten, Pre-Preparatory and early Primary with the English curriculum on the Home Island Campus. The Home Language of Cocos Malay is valued whilst students engage in learning English.

Culture

Although it is an Australian territory, the culture of the islands has extensive influences from Malaysia and Indonesia due to its predominantly ethnic Malay population.

Heritage listings 
The West Island Mosque on Alexander Street is listed on the Australian Commonwealth Heritage List.

Museum 
The Pulu Cocos Museum on Home Island was established in 1987, in recognition of the fact that the distinct culture of Home Island needed formal preservation. The site includes the displays on local culture and traditions, as well as the early history of the islands and their ownership by the Clunies-Ross family. The museum also includes displays on military and naval history, as well as local botanical and zoological items.

Marine park 
Reefs near the islands have healthy coral and are home to several rare species of marine life. The region, along with the Christmas Island reefs, have been described as "Australia's Galapagos Islands".

In the 2021 budget the Australian Government committed $A39.1M to create two new marine parks off Christmas Island and the Cocos (Keeling) Islands. The park will help to protect spawning of bluefin tuna from illegal international fishers, but local people will be allowed to practice fishing sustainably inshore in order to source food.

Sport 
Cricket and rugby league are the two main organised sports on the islands.

Cocos Islands Golf Club is located on West island and established in 1962.

Image gallery

See also 

 Banknotes of the Cocos (Keeling) Islands
 Index of Cocos (Keeling) Islands-related articles
 Pearl Islands (Isla de Cocos, Panama; Cocos Island, Costa Rica).

Notes

References

Citations

Sources 

 
 Clunies-Ross, John Cecil; Souter, Gavin. The Clunies-Ross Cocos Chronicle, Self, Perth 2009, .

External links 

 Shire of Cocos (Keeling) Islands homepage
 Areas of individual islets
 Atoll Research Bulletin vol. 403
 Cocos (Keeling) Islands Tourism website
 
 Noel Crusz, The Cocos Islands mutiny , reviewed by Peter Stanley (Principal Historian, Australian War Memorial).
 The man who lost a "coral kingdom"
 Amateur Radio DX Pedition to Cocos (Keeling) Islands VK9EC

 
1955 establishments in Asia
1955 establishments in Australia
Archipelagoes of Australia
Archipelagoes of the Indian Ocean
.
British rule in Singapore
Island countries of the Indian Ocean
Islands of Southeast Asia
States and territories established in 1955
States and territories of Australia